Ritter Sankt Georg, also known as Sankt Georg, was a galleon warship that served in the Polish–Lithuanian Commonwealth Navy from 1627 to 1628.

Name 
The ship is referred to in the German-language sources as Ritter Sankt Georg, and shortly as Sankt Georg, which, respectively, mean Knight of Saint George, and Saint George. The Polish-language name that was used for the ship in the 17th century remains unknown, however, the ship is retroactively referred to as Rycerz Święty Jerzy and Święty Jerzy, in modern Polish-language sources, which is a direct translation of the German name.

History 
The ship was made in the town of Puck, Poland, and its construction lasted from 1625 to 1627. After its launch, it served for the Polish–Lithuanian Commonwealth Navy.

It was a flagship of the navy during the Battle of Oliwa of Polish–Swedish War, that took place on 28 November 1627. It was commanded by the Admiral Arend Dickmann, while Hieronim Teschke was the skipper. On its board was also Capitan Jan Storch who commanded the marines. During the battle, Ritter Sankt Georg had attacked and boarded the enemy galleon Tigern. The fight aboard the ship ended with Polish victory and the capture of the vessel. Ritter Sankt Georg had also fired from the broadside, hitting the enemy galleon Pelikanen. The Admiral Arend Dickmann had died at the end of the battle, aboard Tigern, being hit with the stray round shot, that was probably shot from the enemy Pelikanen, or in the friendly fire from Fliegender Hirsch. Ritter Sankt Georg itself sustained the damages in the battle, including being hit 3 times under the line of water.

On 2 May 1628, Hieronim Teschke become the new captain of the ship. On 5 or 6 July 1628 Polish ships were attacked by Swedish artillery near the Wisłoujście Fortress at the Martwa Wisła river. After midnight, on 6 July, Ritter Sankt Georg got stuck on the backshore. Before it managed to free itself, it got seriously damaged by the Swedish artillery. The crew had abandoned the ship in the early morning, following which, it burned down. Captain Teschke died during the fight. The rest of the ships had retreated up the river, with the exception of Gelber Löwe which also got destroyed in the battle,

Specifications 
The ship was a galleon with the length of a hull between the stems being around 24 m (120 Amsterdam feet) and the width of the hull is 7.4 m (26 Amsterdam feet). It had a cargo capacity of around 400 tones (200 lasts). The ship had 31 cannons of various caliber at the broadside. Its crew counted 50 sailors and 100 marines.

Citations

Notes

References

Bibliography 
 J. Pertek: Polacy na morzach i oceanach, vol. 1, Poznań: Wydaw. Poznańskie, 1981, ISBN 83-210-0141-6, OCLC 749548852.
 Maciej Flis: Twierdza Wisłoujście. In: Muzeum Gdańska. Przewodnik ilustrowany. Warsaw: Foto Liner, 2018. ISBN 978-83-62559-29-9.

Naval ships of Poland
Galleons
1620s ships
Ships sunk by coastal artillery
Shipwrecks in rivers